The 2013 Montana State Bobcats football team represented Montana State University as a member of the Big Sky Conference during the 2013 NCAA Division I FCS football season. Led by seventh-year head coach Rob Ash, Montana State compiled an overall record of 7–5 with a mark of 5–3 in conference play, tying for fourth place in the Big Sky. The Bobcats played their home games at Bobcat Stadium in Bozeman, Montana.

Schedule

Game summaries

Monmouth

@ SMU

Colorado Mesa

@ Stephen F. Austin

@ North Dakota

Northern Arizona

@ Weber State

UC Davis

@ Northern Colorado

@ Eastern Washington

Southern Utah

Montana

Ranking movements

References

Montana State
Montana State Bobcats football seasons
Montana State Bobcats football